Flórida is a municipality in the state of Paraná in the Southern Region of Brazil.

See also
List of municipalities in Paraná

References

Municipalities in Paraná